As of Yet is an American comedy film written by Taylor Garron and co-directed with Chanel James. Garron also stars. It premiered at the 2021 Tribeca Film Festival, where it received the Nora Ephron Award.

Plot 
The film "centers on Naomi (Garron), who navigates a problematic roommate and a burgeoning romance, all while locked down during the coronavirus pandemic."

Cast 
 Taylor Garron as Naomi, a young woman based in Brooklyn, trying to adjust to life at the onset of the COVID-19 pandemic
 Eva Victor as Sara, Naomi's roommate, who goes to Florida to stay with her parents during the pandemic lockdown
 Amir Khan as Reed, a man Naomi meets through a dating app
 Quinta Brunson as Lyssa, one of Naomi's best friends
 Ayo Edebiri as Khadijah, another of Naomi's best friends
 Paula Akpan as Sadie, Naomi's British cousin

Production 
Taylor Garron and Chanel James co-directed As of Yet, which Garron also wrote and in which she also stars. The pair worked together previously on James' directorial debut The Things We Do When We’re Alone. The Duplass Brothers produced the film with Garron and Ashley Edouard.

The film is depicted entirely though Facetime calls and video diary entries, similar to other movies released during the pandemic such as Language Lessons.

Release 
The film premiered at Tribeca Film Festival in June 2021. It later screened at the Philadelphia Film Festival.

Reception 
The film received mainly positive reception. In a positive review, Lovia Gyarkye wrote in The Hollywood Reporter, "Garron and Victor’s portrayal of friends who are struggling to understand each other’s point of view is refreshingly honest and appropriately cringey. Conversations are at the heart of As of Yet, and Garron manages to capture how they ebb and flow with the different rhetorical quirks people develop." Candice Frederick of TheGrio noted that "nothing is particularly innovative about its style", but also described the film as "engaging to watch obviously resonant reflections of life’s new challenges articulated on screen".

In Hype, Darren Paltrowitz hailed Garron's performance: "Garron herself shines in As Of Yet, a smartly-paced comedic portrait of a young single woman navigating through a very-troubling 2020." Similarly, M.G. Mailloux of In Review Online praised her acting: "Garron is charismatic and lively as a performer, her presence never deflating or grating", but also stated that "as of yet never quite figures out how to say all that it wants to say without forsaking nuance or elegance".

Awards and nominations 
 2021 – Tribeca Film Festival, Nora Ephron Award, Winner
 2021 – Denver International Film Festival, American Independent Film Award, Nominee

References

External links 

As of Yet at Rotten Tomatoes

American comedy films
2021 films
Films shot in New York City
2021 comedy films
Films set in Brooklyn
American independent films
Films about the COVID-19 pandemic
Duplass Brothers Productions films
2020s English-language films
2020s American films